The 1947 Navy Midshipmen football team was an American football team that represented the United States Naval Academy as an independent during the 1947 college football season. In its fifth non-consecutive season under head coach Tom Hamilton, the team compiled a 1–7–1 record and was outscored by a total of 165 to 86.

Schedule

References

Navy
Navy Midshipmen football seasons
Navy Midshipmen football